Péter Nagy (born 16 January 1986 in Komárom, Hungary) is a Hungarian weightlifter. He competed at the 2012 Summer Olympics in the +105 kg event. Nagy won a bronze medal in the +105 kg snatch at the 2012 European Weightlifting Championships and a gold medal at the 2011 Summer Universiade (he was second after the competition but received the gold when Mohamed Masoud was disqualified).

Major results

References

External links
 
 
 
 

1986 births
Living people
Hungarian male weightlifters
Olympic weightlifters of Hungary
Weightlifters at the 2012 Summer Olympics
Weightlifters at the 2016 Summer Olympics
Weightlifters at the 2020 Summer Olympics
Universiade medalists in weightlifting
People from Komárom
Universiade gold medalists for Hungary
European Weightlifting Championships medalists
Medalists at the 2011 Summer Universiade
Sportspeople from Komárom-Esztergom County
20th-century Hungarian people
21st-century Hungarian people